TAT-11 was AT&T Corporation's 11th transatlantic telephone cable, in operation from 1993, initially carrying 2 x 565 Mbit/s between the United States and France. 

The cable ran between Manahawkin, New Jersey, United States to Saint-Hilaire-de-Riez in France and Oxwich Bay in Wales.

Its capacity was 3x565 between the US and the UK or between France and the US or between the UK and France. Its usual working configuration was 2x565 between UK - US, 1x565 between UK - France and 1x565 between US and France. The system was retired in 2004.

Infrastructure completed in 1993
Transatlantic communications cables
France–United States relations
France–United Kingdom relations
United Kingdom–United States relations
1993 establishments in France
1993 establishments in New Jersey
1993 establishments in Wales
2004 disestablishments in France
2004 disestablishments in New Jersey
2004 disestablishments in Wales